Guryevsk is a town in Kemerovo Oblast, Russia, located  southeast of Kemerovo, the administrative center of the oblast. Population:

History
It was founded in 1815 and was granted town status in 1938.

Administrative and municipal status
Within the framework of administrative divisions, Guryevsk serves as the administrative center of Guryevsky District, even though is not a part of it. As an administrative division, it is, together with one town (Salair) and two rural localities, incorporated separately as Guryevsk Town Under Oblast Jurisdiction—an administrative unit with a status equal to that of the districts. As a municipal division, the town of Guryevsk is incorporated within Guryevsky Municipal District as Guryevskoye Urban Settlement. The town of Salair and the two rural localities are incorporated within Guryevsky Municipal District as Salairskoye Urban Settlement.

References

Notes

Sources

External links

Official website of Guryevsk 
Guryevsk Business Directory  

Cities and towns in Kemerovo Oblast